This page lists the largest annual and quarterly earnings and losses in corporate history. In general terms the oil and gas industry is the one generating both largest annual and quarterly earnings. In contrast, both the annual and quarterly losses are more distributed across industries.

Largest corporate annual earnings of all time
This list has all global annual earnings of all time, limited to earnings of more than $40 billion in "real" (i.e. CPI adjusted) value. Note that some record earning may be caused by nonrecurring revenue, like Vodafone in 2014 (disposal of its interest in Verizon Wireless) or Fannie Mae in 2013 (benefit for federal income taxes).

Largest corporate annual losses of all time 

This list has all global annual losses of all time, limited to losses of more than $20 billion in real value (July 2022).

Largest corporate quarterly earnings of all time 

This list has all global quarterly earnings of all time, limited to earnings of more than $10 billion in real value (June 2011).

Largest corporate quarterly losses of all time 

This list has all global quarterly losses of all time, limited to losses of more than $10 billion in real value (June 2011).

See also
 Forbes Global 2000
 List of largest companies by revenue
 List of largest employers
 List of largest losses of wealth
 List of public corporations by market capitalization
 List of wealthiest religious organizations
 List of most indebted companies

References

Citations

Sources 

 Biggest UK corporate losses: http://news.bbc.co.uk/2/hi/business/7911722.stm
 BP swings to massive $17.2 billion loss: http://money.cnn.com/2010/07/27/news/companies/bp_earnings/index.htm
 AIG quarterly loss is $61.7 billion: Biggest loss in US corporate history : http://www.huffingtonpost.com/2009/03/02/aig-quarterly-loss-is-617_n_171001.html
 The biggest annual profits at U.S. companies revealed : https://www.usatoday.com/money/perfi/columnist/krantz/2008-02-28-biggest-profits_N.htm
 Exxon Mobil reported the largest annual profit in U.S. history : http://www.nydailynews.com/money/2009/01/30/2009-01-30_exxon_mobil_reported_the_largest_annual_.html
 Exxon Mobil posts record $14.8 billion Q3 profit : http://www.domain-b.com/companies/companies_e/Exxon_Mobil/20081030_ExxonMobil.html
 BP, Shell gain over $10 billion each in Q3 net : http://www.domain-b.com/industry/oil_gas/20081030_gain.html
 UBS makes biggest quarterly loss in banking history : http://www.guardian.co.uk/business/2008/feb/14/europe.europeanbanks
 GM reports biggest-ever automotive loss : http://www.nbcnews.com/id/23124844
 Ford looks ahead to 2009 after record loss of $12.7B in 2006 : https://www.usatoday.com/money/autos/2007-01-25-ford-loss_x.htm
 UBS loss biggest in Swiss corporate history : https://www.reuters.com/article/idUSTRE51918R20090210
 AIG Reports $62B Loss for Q4; $99B for Year : http://www.insurancejournal.com/news/national/2009/03/02/98289.htm
 Time Warner reports huge loss, announces job cuts : http://www.abc.net.au/news/stories/2009/02/05/2483470.htm?section=justin
 The Global 2000 - Forbes.com : https://www.forbes.com/lists/2009/18/global-09_The-Global-2000_Prof.html
 Royal Dutch Shell plc Annual Review and Summary Financial Statements 2008 : https://archive.today/20130104162330/http://www.annualreview.shell.com/2008/reviewoftheyear/selectedfinancialdata.php
 Royal Dutch Shell plc Second Quarter 2009 - Key Financial Data in dollars, euros and pounds sterling : http://www-static.shell.com/static/investor/downloads/financial_information/quarterly_results/2009/q2/q2_2009_keyfinancials.pdf

Lists of companies
 
Largest corporate profits and losses